Pinna is a genus of bivalve molluscs belonging to the family Pinnidae. 

The type species of the genus is Pinna rudis.

The most completely studied species in the genus is P. nobilis, a Mediterranean pen shell which was historically important as the principal source of sea silk.

Description

They are characterized by thin, elongated, wedge-shaped, and almost triangular shells with long, toothless edges. The surface of the shells shows radial ribs over their entire length.

Pinna is distinguished from its sibling genus Atrina by the presence of a sulcus dividing the nacreous region of the valves, and the positioning of the adductor scar on the dorsal side of shells.

These bivalves most commonly lie point-first on the sea bottom in which they live, anchored by a net of byssus threads.

Distribution
Species in the genus Pinna are geographically widespread. This genus is very ancient, going back up to the Carboniferous period. It is especially represented in Jurassic and Cretaceous fossils.

Species
According to the World Register of Marine Species, species in the genus Pinna include:

 † Pinna affinis J. Sowerby, 1821 †
 Pinna angustana Lamarck, 1819
 † Pinna arcuata J. Sowerby, 1821 
 Pinna atropurpurea Sowerby, 1825
 Pinna attenuata Reeve, 1858
 Pinna bichi Thach, 2016
 Pinna bicolor Gmelin, 1791
 Pinna carnea Gmelin, 1791
 Pinna cellophana Matsukuma & Okutani, 1986
 Pinna deltodes Menke, 1843
 † Pinna dissimilicostata X.-M. Gan, 1978 
 † Pinna distans Hutton, 1873 
 Pinna dolabrata Lamarck, 1819
 Pinna electrina Reeve, 1858
 Pinna epica Jousseaume, 1894
 Pinna exquisita Dall, Bartsch & Rehder, 1938
 Pinna fimbriatula Reeve, 1859
 † Pinna folium Young & Bird, 1822 
 † Pinna huiyangensis R.-J. Zhang, 1977
 Pinna incurva Gmelin, 1791
  † Pinna kawhiana Marwick, 1953 
  † Pinna keexwaanensis McRoberts, 2017 
  † Pinna lanceolata J. Sowerby, 1821
  † Pinna lata Hutton, 1873 (taxon inquirendum)
 Pinna linguafelis (Habe, 1953)
 Pinna madida Reeve, 1858
 Pinna menkei Reeve, 1858
 † Pinna mitis Phillips, 1829 
 † Pinna muikadanensis Nakazawa, 1961
 Pinna muricata Linnaeus, 1758
 Pinna nobilis Linnaeus, 1758 -- Grande nacre
 † Pinna nyainrongensis S.-X. Wen, 1979 
 † Pinna octavia Marwick, 1953 
 Pinna papyracea Gmelin, 1791
 † Pinna plicata Hutton, 1873  (Based on a fragment of a trace fossil called Zoophycus)
 Pinna rapanui Araya & Osorio, 2016
 Pinna rudis Linnaeus, 1758
 Pinna rugosa Sowerby, 1835
 Pinna sanguinolenta Reeve, 1858
 † Pinna socialis d'Orbigny, 1850 
 † Pinna subcuneata Eichwald, 1865 
 † Pinna suprajurensis d'Orbigny, 1850 
 Pinna trigonalis Pease, 1861
 Pinna trigonium Dunker, 1852
 Pinna wayae Schultz & M. Huber, 2013

Nomen nudum
 Pinna inflata Röding, 1798
 Pinna lubrica Lightfoot, 1786
 Pinna nebulosa Lightfoot, 1786 
 Pinna nigricans Lightfoot, 1786 
 Pinna striata Röding, 1798
 Pinna tenera Lightfoot, 1786 
 Pinna violacea Röding, 1798

Nomen dubium
 Pinna atrata Clessin, 1891 
 Pinna bullata Gmelin, 1791
 Pinna marginata Lamarck, 1819 
 Pinna minax Hanley, 1858 
 Pinna rollei Clessin, 1891
 Pinna rostellum Hanley, 1858 
 Pinna rotundata Linnaeus, 1758 
 Pinna sanguinea Gmelin, 1791
 Pinna virgata Menke, 1843

Synonyms
 Pinna squamosissima Philippi, 1849: synonym of Atrina serrata (G. B. Sowerby I, 1825)
 Pinna strangei Reeve, 1858: synonym of Atrina strangei (Reeve, 1858)
 Pinna stutchburii Reeve, 1859: synonym of Pinna attenuata Reeve, 1858
 Pinna subviridis Reeve, 1858: synonym of Atrina seminuda (Lamarck, 1819)
 Pinna tasmanica Tenison-Woods, 1876: synonym of Atrina tasmanica (Tenison Woods, 1876)
 Pinna truncata Philippi, 1844: synonym of Atrina fragilis (Pennant, 1777)
 Pinna tuberculosa Sowerby, 1835: synonym of Atrina tuberculosa (G. B. Sowerby I, 1835)
 Pinna varicosa Lamarck, 1819: synonym of Pinna carnea Gmelin, 1791
 Pinna vespertina Reeve, 1858: synonym of Pinna atropurpurea G. B. Sowerby I, 1825
 Pinna vexillum Born, 1778: synonym of Atrina vexillum (Born, 1778)
 Pinna vitrea Gmelin, 1791: synonym of Streptopinna saccata (Linnaeus, 1758)
 Pinna vulgaris Roissy, 1804: synonym of Pinna nobilis Linnaeus, 1758
 Pinna whitechurchi Turton, 1932: synonym of Atrina squamifera (G. B. Sowerby I, 1835)
 Pinna zebuensis Reeve, 1858: synonym of Pinna muricata Linnaeus, 1758
 Pinna zelandica Gray, 1835: synonym of Atrina zelandica (Gray, 1835)

References

Frank H.T. Rodes, Herbert S. Zim en Paul R. Shaffer (1993) - Natuurgids Fossielen (het ontstaan, prepareren en rangschikken van fossielen), Zuidnederlandse Uitgeverij N.V., Aartselaar. ISBN D-1993-0001-361
Cyril Walker & David Ward (1993) - Fossielen: Sesam Natuur Handboeken, Bosch & Keuning, Baarn. 

 Coan, E. V.; Valentich-Scott, P. (2012). Bivalve seashells of tropical West America. Marine bivalve mollusks from Baja California to northern Peru. 2 vols, 1258 pp.
 Schultz, P. W.; Huber, M. (2013). Revision of the worldwide Recent Pinnidae and some remarks of fossil European Pinnidae. Acta Conchyliorum. 13: 1-164.

External links
 Linnaeus, C. (1758). Systema Naturae per regna tria naturae, secundum classes, ordines, genera, species, cum characteribus, differentiis, synonymis, locis. Editio decima, reformata 
 Mörch, O. A. L. (1852-1853). Catalogus conchyliorum quae reliquit D. Alphonso d'Aguirra & Gadea Comes de Yoldi, Regis Daniae Cubiculariorum Princeps, Ordinis Dannebrogici in Prima Classe & Ordinis Caroli Tertii Eques. Fasc. 1, Cephalophora, 170 pp. [1852; Fasc. 2, Acephala, Annulata, Cirripedia, Echinodermata, 74 [+2] pp. [1853]. Hafniae [Copenhagen]: L. Klein]
 Children J. G. (1822-1823). Lamarck's genera of shells. Quarterly Journal of Science, Literature and the Arts (London), 14(27): 64-87, pl. 3-4 [ottobre 1822; 14(28): 298-322, pl. 5-6 [gennaio 1823]; 15(29): 23-52, pl. 2-3 [aprile 1823]; 15(30): 216-258, pl. 7-8 [luglio 1823]; 16 (31): 49-79, pl. 5 [ottobre 1823]; 16 (32): 241-264, pl. 6 [dicembre 1823]. [Vedi anche Kennard, Salisbury & Woodward, 1931],]

Pinnidae
Bivalve genera
Taxa named by Carl Linnaeus